Christopher A. Seeger is an American lawyer who specializes in multidistrict mass tort and class action litigation. He received the most multidistrict litigation (MDL) appointments of any lawyer between 2016 and 2019 according to an 2020 ALM study. Seeger is a founding partner of the firm Seeger Weiss LLP.

Early life 
A native of New York City, Seeger is the son of a union carpenter and a homemaker. He pursued an amateur boxing career until he was 22. Seeger worked as a carpenter before beginning his undergraduate studies at Hunter College.

Seeger graduated summa cum laude from Hunter in 1987, and magna cum laude from Benjamin N. Cardozo School of Law in 1990. While in law school, he served as managing editor of the Cardozo Law Review.

Career 
Seeger's first job out of law school was with a "white-shoe" firm that represented major corporations, which he left in 1993 to work instead on behalf of plaintiffs. In 1999 he co-founded with Stephen A. Weiss the plaintiffs’ law firm Seeger Weiss LLP. As of 2020, the firm maintains offices in New York, New Jersey, and Pennsylvania.

In 2003, Seeger recovered a $2 million verdict following a six-week jury trial against drug maker Pfizer on behalf of a Brooklyn resident who sustained livery injury following her use of the diabetes medication Rezulin. The case was the first Rezulin matter to be tried in New York and represented a watershed result in the nationwide Rezulin litigation. Seeger subsequently reached a global settlement with Pfizer on behalf of his firm's clients.

In 2005, Seeger was appointed co-lead counsel of Vioxx-related MDL against Merck by U.S. District Judge Eldon Fallon. In 2007, Seeger won a $47.5 million verdict on behalf of an individual plaintiff, Idaho postal worker Frederick "Mike" Humeston, who suffered a heart attack after taking the drug. In 2008, Seeger was a lead negotiator in the $4.85 billion Vioxx settlement on behalf of plaintiffs. Seeger was one of the first lawyers to file a Vioxx-related injury lawsuit against Merck.

In 2009, Seeger represented homeowners who had defective Chinese-manufactured drywall installed in their homes. The drywall emitted noxious fumes which caused headaches and rashes, made breathing difficult, and damaged household wiring and plumbing. Seeger secured the initial trial victories against the companies that produced and distributed the drywall, paving the way for a subsequent $1 billion nationwide settlement.

In 2011, he was appointed to the Plaintiffs' Executive Committee in the multidistrict litigation related to DePuy Orthopaedics' defective hip implants, which resulted in DePuy's parent company Johnson & Johnson agreeing to a global settlement of $2.5 billion.

Since 2012, Seeger served as lead counsel representing retired NFL players in a suit brought against the league for hiding the dangers of concussion injuries. He negotiated a settlement in which the NFL agreed to pay an uncapped amount, estimated to be over $1.5 billion, to address the medical costs of over 20,000 former players who suffered traumatic brain injuries during their professional careers. The settlement was approved by a federal court and upheld by the Third Circuit Court of Appeals in April 2016. As of September, 2022, more than $1 billion in claims have been approved.

In 2016, Seeger was appointed to the Plaintiffs’ Steering Committee in the “clean diesel” litigation against German automaker Volkswagen in connection to the company's project to game the emissions tests on their cars. He also served on the settlement committee, which negotiated an approximately $14 billion settlement with VW on behalf of plaintiffs.

In 2017, Seeger served as lead negotiator in litigation against agrochemical giant Syngenta regarding Viptera genetically modified corn. The settlement, reached in 2018, totaled $1.5 billion for plaintiffs (primarily U.S. corn farmers). It represents the largest agricultural litigation settlement in U.S. history.

In 2019, Seeger was appointed co-lead counsel in multidistrict litigation against 3M. The litigation includes over 250,000 veterans suffering from hearing loss and tinnitus after using earplugs 3M sold to the U.S. Department of Defense, which the suit claims the company knew to be faulty.

Since 2019, Seeger has served as interim co-lead counsel for a proposed "negotiation class" of local governments in the pursuit of a nationwide settlement against drug companies in multidistrict opioid litigation. Over 90 percent of litigating local governments participated in global settlements with AmerisourceBergen, Cardinal Health, and McKesson, and Johnson & Johnson totaling $26 billion.

In 2021, it was announced that Seeger, along with civil rights attorney Benjamin Crump, would be representing the family of Henrietta Lacks in a lawsuit against several pharmaceutical companies that have profited from the cell line HeLa, which is based on cervical cancer cells taken from Lacks without her knowledge in 1951. The first lawsuit was filed against ThermoFisher.  

In 2022, Seeger was appointed Co-lead Counsel in an MDL prosecuting claims related to the disintegration or outgassing of foam in Philips CPAP sleep apnea machines and other Philips assisted breathing devices.

Personal life 
Since his time as an amateur boxer, Seeger has also competed in Brazilian jiu-jitsu and was awarded first place for his age and weight class in the 2012 Pan American No-Gi Jiu-Jitsu Championship. He received his black belt in Brazilian jiu-jitsu in 2017.

Awards and recognition 
Seeger is an elected member of the American Law Institute and a Fellow of the International Society of Barristers. He sits on the advisory board at the New York University Law School Civil Justice Center and on the Leadership Council at the Bolch Judicial Institute’s Leadership Council Duke Law School. He is a member of the National Trial Lawyers Round Table.  Chris was recognized with The National Law Journal’s Elite Trial Lawyers Lifetime Achievement Award in 2022. The award honors Chris for the indelible mark he has left on his community, clients, and practice throughout his accomplished career in the plaintiffs’ bar.

See also 
Chinese drywall
2010 DePuy Hip Recall
Volkswagen emissions scandal
Federal NFL Concussion Litigation

Notes 

Living people
Hunter College alumni
Benjamin N. Cardozo School of Law alumni
New York (state) lawyers
1960 births